The canton of Marle is an administrative division in northern France. At the French canton reorganisation which came into effect in March 2015, the canton was expanded from 23 to 65 communes:
 
Agnicourt-et-Séchelles
Assis-sur-Serre
Autremencourt
Barenton-Bugny
Barenton-Cel
Barenton-sur-Serre
Berlancourt
Bois-lès-Pargny
Bosmont-sur-Serre
Chalandry
Châtillon-lès-Sons
Chéry-lès-Pouilly
Chevennes
Cilly
Colonfay
Couvron-et-Aumencourt
Crécy-sur-Serre
Cuirieux
Dercy
Erlon
Franqueville
Froidmont-Cohartille
Grandlup-et-Fay
Le Hérie-la-Viéville
Housset
Landifay-et-Bertaignemont
Lemé
Lugny
Marcy-sous-Marle
Marfontaine
Marle
Mesbrecourt-Richecourt
Monceau-le-Neuf-et-Faucouzy
Monceau-le-Waast
Montigny-le-Franc
Montigny-sous-Marle
Montigny-sur-Crécy
Mortiers
La Neuville-Bosmont
La Neuville-Housset
Nouvion-et-Catillon
Nouvion-le-Comte
Pargny-les-Bois
Pierrepont
Pouilly-sur-Serre
Puisieux-et-Clanlieu
Remies
Rogny
Rougeries
Sains-Richaumont
Saint-Gobert
Saint-Pierre-lès-Franqueville
Saint-Pierremont
Sons-et-Ronchères
Le Sourd
Tavaux-et-Pontséricourt
Thiernu
Toulis-et-Attencourt
La Vallée-au-Blé
Verneuil-sur-Serre
Vesles-et-Caumont
Voharies
Voulpaix
Voyenne  
Wiège-Faty

Demographics

See also
Cantons of the Aisne department 
Communes of France

References

Cantons of Aisne